John W. Dawson (December 20, 1902 – January 6, 1986) was an American amateur golfer and golf course architect.

Dawson was born in Chicago, Illinois. Although he was a lifelong amateur golfer, his amateur status was rescinded by the United States Golf Association (USGA) for a time due to his employment with the Spalding sporting goods company. His amateur status was eventually restored and he competed in several USGA events. He was runner-up (at the age of 44) to Skee Riegel in 1947 U.S. Amateur. He played on the winning 1949 Walker Cup team. He was also runner-up in 1958 U.S. Senior Amateur

As a developer, he designed and built Marrakesh Country Club, the Seven Lakes, Thunderbird, El Dorado, and La Quinta Country Clubs; he lived in Palm Springs.

Dawson won the Southern California Golf Association (SCGA) amateur championship four times between 1942 and 1952, and was inducted into the SCGA Hall of Fame in 2007.

Amateur wins(6)

 1936 Trans-Mississippi Amateur
 1942 California State Amateur, Southern California Amateur
 1944 Southern California Amateur
 1945 Southern California Amateur
 1952 Southern California Amateur

Professional wins (3)
Note: all wins were as an amateur

PGA Tour wins (1)
 1942 Bing Crosby Pro-Am

Other wins (2)

 1935 Iowa Open
 1942 California State Open

U.S. national team appearances
Amateur
 Walker Cup: 1949 (winners)

References

 

American male golfers
Amateur golfers
Golf course architects
Golfers from Chicago
Golfers from California
Sportspeople from Palm Springs, California
Sportspeople from Chicago
1902 births
1986 deaths
20th-century American people